Namacurra District is a district of Zambezia Province in Mozambique. With a population of over 240,000 in 2017, the Namacurra District has undergone moderate population growth since the late 1990s, when its population was only approximately 160,000.

Further reading
District profile (PDF)

Districts in Zambezia Province